Crisol de hombres is a 1954 Argentine film.

Cast

External links
 

1954 films
1950s Spanish-language films
Argentine black-and-white films
Argentine comedy-drama films
1954 comedy-drama films
1950s Argentine films